Darius Milhaud (1892–1974) was a French composer. 

Milhaud may also refer to:

Milhaud (name), French surname
Milhaud, Gard, French village, origin of the surname